ACS or Acs may refer to:

Organizations and societies
 American Cancer Society, an American voluntary health organization dedicated to eliminating cancer
 American Ceramic Society, an American professional organization
 American Cheese Society, a professional organization of the American cheese industry
 American Chemical Society, an American professional association
 American College of Surgeons, a fellowship of American surgeons
 American Colonization Society, an organization that helped in founding Liberia as a colony for freed slaves
 American Constitution Society for Law and Policy, an organization of lawyers and law students in the US
 American Cryonics Society, non-profit corporation that supports and promotes research and education into cryonics
 American CueSports Alliance, a US-based pool league 
 Association of Caribbean States, an advisory, consultative body of Caribbean countries
 Association of Cricket Statisticians and Historians, an association founded England in 1973 to collect cricket data
 Audience Council Scotland, a BBC Trust organisation in Scotland
 Australian Cinematographers Society
 Australian Computer Society, an association for information and communications technology professionals
 Australian Cricket Society, an association of cricket lovers
 Redfern Aboriginal Children's Services, a community services organisation for Indigenous children in Sydney, Australia

Sports
 AC Sparta Prague, a Czech football club
 AC Sporting, a Lebanese football club

Companies and commerce
 ACS:Law, a British law firm specializing in intellectual property cases
 Advanced Card Systems, a Hong Kong-based developer of smart cards and smart card readers
 Advanced Composites Solutions, a Brazilian engineering company specialized in composite materials technology
 Advanced Contact Solutions, a Philippine business process outsourcing company
 Affiliated Computer Services, an America business and technology outsourcing company
 Air Cess, a cargo airline based in Sharjah, United Arab Emirates
 Alaska Communications System, former name of AT&T Alascom, an American communications services company
 Alaska Communications Systems, an American communications services company, distinct from AT&T Alascom
 Alternative compensation system, a way to allow reproduction of digital copyrighted works while still paying the authors and copyright owners
 Applied Communication Sciences, a telecommunications research, engineering and consulting company based in the US
 Grupo ACS (Actividades de Construcción y Servicios), a civil engineering firm based in Madrid, Spain

Computing and technology
 ACS-1 and ACS-360, supercomputers designed but never completed in the 1960s by the IBM Advanced Computing Systems
 Access Control Service, a cloud-based service for authentication and authorization
 Access Control Server, a component of Cisco's Network Admission Control technology
 Access Control Server, the server authenticating a card in the 3-D Secure framework
 Action Code Script, a scripting language used in video games such as HeXen and Doom ports
 Adobe Creative Suite, a software package by Adobe Inc.
 Advanced Camera for Surveys, an instrument aboard the Hubble Space Telescope
 Air cavity system, a modern marine craft design concept based upon capturing air beneath a vessel's hull to reduce drag and increase speed and fuel efficiency
 Atacama Large Millimeter Array ("ALMA")  Common Software, a control framework used in ground-based astronomy projects
 Attitude control system, a spacecraft system
 Audit Collection Services, a component of Microsoft System Center Operations Manager

Education
 ACS International Schools, a group of international schools in the UK
 Advanced Communicator, Silver ("ACS"),  Toastmasters International Recognition for advanced Communication training
 Alabaster City Schools, a school district headquartered in Alabaster, Alabama
 Alperton Community School, a secondary school in London, UK
 American College of Sofia, a secondary school in Sofia, Bulgaria
 American Community School at Beirut, an international private school located in Beirut, Lebanon
 American Community School in Amman, an international school in Amman, Jordan
 American Community School of Abu Dhabi, an international school of Abu Dhabi, United Arab Emirates
 American Community Schools, an English-speaking private school system in Athens, Greece
 American Cooperative School of La Paz
 American Cooperative School of Tunis
 Anglo-Chinese School, Singapore, a group of Methodist schools in Singapore
 Anglo-Chinese Schools, Malaysia, a group of Methodist schools in Malaysia
 Arkansas Correctional School, a school system in prisons, in Arkansas
 Associated Colleges of the South, a group of liberal arts colleges in the US
 Assumption College School, a catholic high school in Ontario, Canada
 Aurora Christian Schools, a private PreK-12 school in Aurora, Illinois, US
 Avery Coonley School, a private elementary school in Downers Grove, Illinois, US
 Lehman Alternative Community School, a combined middle and high school Ithaca, New York

Government
 American Community Survey, a project of the US Census Bureau
 Administration for Children's Services, governmental agency of New York City
 Australian Customs Service, former Australian government agency responsible for Australian border protection (1985–2009)

Medicine and science
 2-Amino-3-carboxymuconic semialdehyde, a chemical in tryptophan metabolism
 Acetyl-CoA Synthetase, an enzyme
 Acute compartment syndrome
 Acute coronary syndrome, a form of chest pain due to reduced oxygen supply to the heart muscle
 Advanced Cataract Surgery, the modern method of cataract removal using phacoemulsification
 Alternate care site, a non-traditional medical treatment facility established in a public health crisis
 Anticenter shell, a supershell located outside of the galaxy
 Atriocaval shunt, a surgical procedure

Military 
 Attack Characterization System
 Aerial Common Sensor, a Lockheed Martin reconnaissance aircraft airframe for the US Army and Navy
 Army Combat Shirt, flame-resistant shirt developed for the US Army
 Auxiliary crane ship, a vessel of the US Navy
 Cavalry Corps (Ireland) (1st Armoured Cavalry Squadron), an armoured reconnaissance unit of the Irish Army

Places
 Ács, a Hungarian town
 Achinsk Airport, an airport in Krasnoyarsk Krai, Russia (IATA: ACS)

Other uses
 Acs (surname), a surname
 An abbreviation for Acroá language, an extinct Ge language of Brazil